Joseph William O'Hara (27 July 1880 – 12 November 1946) was an Australian rules footballer who played with South Melbourne in the Victorian Football League (VFL).

References

External links 

1880 births
1946 deaths
Australian rules footballers from Victoria (Australia)
Sydney Swans players